Lori Roberts (born 31 August 1968) is a Bahamian diver. She competed in the women's 3 metre springboard event at the 1988 Summer Olympics.

References

External links
 

1968 births
Living people
Bahamian female divers
Olympic divers of the Bahamas
Divers at the 1988 Summer Olympics
Place of birth missing (living people)